Hjälmared is a locality situated in Alingsås Municipality, Västra Götaland County, Sweden. It had 260 inhabitants in 2010.

References 

Populated places in Västra Götaland County
Populated places in Alingsås Municipality